Truncorotaloididae is a family of foraminifera belonging to the superfamily Globorotalioidea in the suborder Globigerinina and the order Rotaliida. It is found in marine sediments from the middle Paleocene to the upper Eocene.

Genera

The family contains the following genera:
 Acarinina
 Astrorotalia
 Igorina
 Morozovella
 Morozovelloides
 Planorotalites
 Praemurica
 Testacarinata

References

External links

Foraminiferida

Foraminifera families
Globigerinina